Buffalo Creek is an  tributary of the Des Plaines River. It begins in Lake Zurich, Illinois and flows mainly south-eastward through Kildeer, Long Grove, Buffalo Grove and Wheeling. In Wheeling, it is named Wheeling Drainage Ditch. It joins the Des Plaines River next to Chicago Executive Airport.

GNIS note 
The GNIS database information dates from 1980 and does not reflect recent changes made to the mouth location during improvements at Chicago Executive Airport. The source location may also have shifted due to housing development in the area. The coordinates used in the information box are from Google Earth.

References 

Rivers of Illinois
Rivers of Lake County, Illinois
Rivers of Cook County, Illinois